Cold Meat Industry was a Swedish independent record label established in 1987 by Roger Karmanik, which specialized in niche music genres such as dark ambient, death industrial, and neoclassical dark wave.

History 

From its inception, Cold Meat Industry gained a reputation for introducing artists that were unique and musically innovative. The label also became known for its contributions to the Gothic and industrial scenes.

The term "Cold Meat Industry" eventually became a musical genre of sorts, referring mostly to avant-garde artists who were influenced by industrial and dark ambient music.

In 2013 the label seemed to have stopped all activities. A notification posted in 2014 on the official Cold Meat Industry Facebook page claimed the official end of the label.

Sound Source 
Sound Source was a short-lived (1991–1992) side-label of CMI. It was specialized in releasing limited tape editions of many CMI artists' debuts, such as Archon Satani, Brighter Death Now, Megaptera, Deutsch Nepal, raison d'être and others.

Legacy 

As of 2009, the core of the label's activity appeared to be presented by traditional CMI bands such as Ordo Rosarius Equilibrio and In Slaughter Natives, whose members collaborated closely with CMI's boss Roger Karmanik.

Notable artists 

 Aghast
 All My Faith Lost...
 Anenzephalia
 Arcana
 Archon Satani
 Ataraxia
 Atomine Elektrine
 Atrium Carceri
 Beyond Sensory Experience
 Blood Axis
 Brighter Death Now (Lille Roger)
 Cernunnos Woods
 Coph Nia
 Dahlia's Tear
 Desiderii Marginis
 Deutsch Nepal
 Folkstorm
 Halgrath
 Ildfrost
 In Blind Embrace
 In Slaughter Natives
 IRM
 Karjalan Sissit
 Knifeladder
 Letum

 Megaptera (Negru Voda)
 Moljebka Pvlse
 Morthound
 Mortiis (Cintecele Diavolui)
 Mz.412 (Maschinenzimmer 412)
 New Risen Throne
 Ordo Rosarius Equilibrio
 Pimentola
 Proscriptor
 Puissance
 Raison d'être
 Rome
 Sanctum
 Sephiroth
 Slogun
 The Soil Bleeds Black
 Sophia
 Spiritual Front
 Sutcliffe Jügend
 V:28
 Valefor
 Vestigial
 Die Weisse Rose
 XXX Atomic Toejam (Memorandum)

See also 
 List of record labels

References 

Swedish independent record labels
Record labels established in 1987
Industrial record labels
Noise music record labels
Ambient music record labels